Cheremshan is the name of several rural localities in the Republic of Tatarstan, Russia:
Cheremshan, Apastovsky District, Republic of Tatarstan, a selo in Apastovsky District
Cheremshan, Cheremshansky District, Republic of Tatarstan, a selo in Cheremshansky District